Stathmopoda perfuga is a moth of the  family Agonoxenidae. It is found on Rapa Iti.

References

Moths described in 1928
Stathmopodidae